In occupational safety and health, hand arm vibrations (HAVs) are a specific type of occupational hazard which can lead to hand arm vibration syndrome.

Description 
Exposure to hand arm vibrations is a respectively newer occupational hazard in the work place.  While hand arm vibrations have been occurring ever since the first usage of the power tool, concern over damage due to HAVS has lagged behind its fellow hazards such as Noise and chemical hazards.  While safety engineers worldwide are collaboratively working on instilling both an Exposure Action Value and an Exposure Limit Value similar to the occupational noise standards, the Occupational Safety and Health Administration, the only regulatory public safety administration in the United States, has yet to offer either official values in the U.S.

Suggested guidelines 

While OSHA has yet to supply these values, other countries agencies have.  The Health and Safety Executive of the British Government suggests to use an Exposure Action Value of 2.5 m/s2 and an Exposure Limit Value of 5.0 m/s2. which is based on the EU directive from 2002.  However, it has been shown that those exposure levels still are not safe as 10% of a population would get sensorineural injuries after 5 years at action level exposure. 
The Canadian Centre for Occupational Health and Safety promotes the ACGIH Threshold Limit Values shown by the adjacent table.  When the time-weighted acceleration data exceeds these numbers for the duration, damage from HAVS begins.

Damage prevention 
There are only a few ways to lower the severity and risk of damage from HAVS without complete engineering redesign on the operation of the tools.  A few examples could be increasing the dampening through thicker gloves and increasing the trigger size of the tool to decrease the stress concentration of the vibrations on the contact area, but the best course of action would be to buy safer tools that vibrate less.  These Exposure Action Values and Exposure Limit Values seem rather low, when compared to lab tested data, shown by the National Institute for Occupational Safety and Health Power Tools Database.  Just an example out of the database, the reciprocating saws look to have extremely violent vibrations with one of the saws vibrations reaching 50 m/s2 in one hand and over 35 m/s2 in the other.

There are various occupational standards of vibration measurement for HAV in use in the United States. They are ANSI S3.34, ACGIH-HAV standard, and NIOSH #89-106. Internationally,
European Union Directive 2002/44/EC and ISO5349 are the vibration measurement standards for HAV.

Reactive monitoring 
While there are different tools used to monitor HAV, a simple system can be used in organizations highlighting excess use of grinding disks when using a hand held angle grinder. This is re-active monitoring and it was introduced by Carl West at a fabrication workshop in Rotherham, England in 2009.

References

External links 
 NIOSH Power Tools Sound Power and Vibrations Database 
 NIOSH Ergonomics hazards page
 HSE Hand Arm Vibration case study page

Safety engineering
Overuse injuries